The Ludovic Trarieux International Human Rights Prize, or Ludovic Trarieux Award, is an international human rights award given annually to a lawyer for contributions to the defence of human rights.

History
The Prize was inaugurated in Bordeaux in 1984 by French lawyer Bertrand Favreau, to recognise lawyers of any Bar or nationality whose work furthered the defence of human rights, the supremacy of law, or resistant to intolerance and racism. The prize is awarded after consultation with international NGOs and humanitarian organizations.
It commemorates the memory of the French lawyer, Ludovic Trarieux (1840–1904), who in the midst of the Dreyfus Affair, in France, in 1898, founded the Ligue des droits de l'homme (LDH), "Human Rights League"). The first prize was awarded, on 29 March 1985, to South African leader Nelson Mandela, during his imprisonment. His daughter, Zenani Mandela Dlamini, received the award on Mandela's behalf on 27 April 1985.  It was the first award given to Mandela in France, and the first internationally to have been awarded to him by lawyers.

Since 2003 the Prize has been awarded jointly by several institutions: the Human Rights Institute of The Bar of Bordeaux, the Human Rights Institute of the Bar of Paris, the Human Rights Institute of The Bar of Brussels, l'Unione forense per la tutela dei diritti dell'uomo (from Rome), the Bar of Amsterdam, Geneva and Luxemburg, the Berlin Bar Association, the Union Internationale des Avocats (UIA) and the European Bar Human Rights Institute (IDHAE), an organization representing human rights lawyers across Europe.

During the last decades, the Prize was presented by Robert Badinter (1998), Guy Canivet (2002), Dean Spielmann (2006), Emma Bonino (2008), Viviane Reding (2011, etc.  The 17th Ludovic Trarieux International Human Rights Prize 2012 was awarded to Muharrem Erbey (Turkey, in jail since December 2009, and presented to his wife, Burçin Erbey, in Berlin by German minister of Justice Sabine Leutheusser-Schnarrenberger on 30 November 2012.

The 18th Ludovic Trarieux International Human Rights Prize 2013 was presented to Vadim Kuramshin, a human rights lawyer similarly imprisoned in Kazakhstan.

Nomination and selection
Nominations are assessed by a panel of 21 lawyers, in consultation with NGOs and bar associations around the world.

Past recipients of the Ludovic Trarieux Award 

1985 : Nelson Mandela, South Africa
1992 : Augusto Zúñiga Paz, Peru
1994 : Jadranka Cigelj, Bosnia-Herzegovina
1996 : joint recipients Nejib Hosni, Tunisia and Dalila Meziane, Algeria
1998 : Zhou Guoqiang, China
2000 : Esber Yagmurdereli, Turkey
2002 : Mehrangiz Kar,  Iran
2003 : joint recipients Digna Ochoa and Bárbara Zamora, Mexico
2004 : Aktham Naisse,   Syria
2005 : Henri Burin des Roziers,   Brazil
2006 : Parvez Imroz,   India
2007 : René Gómez Manzano,   Cuba
2008 : U Aye Myint, Myanmar(Award presented in Berlin by Emma Bonino on 22 October 2008 in the Italian Senate.
2009 : Beatrice Mtetwa,   Zimbabwe
2010 : Karinna Moskalenko,   Russia
2011 : Fathi Terbil,   Libya(Award presented in Brussels by Viviane Reding on 1 December 2011).
2012 : Muharrem Erbey,   Turkey(Award presented in Berlin by German Justice Minister Sabine Leutheusser-Schnarrenberger on 30 November 2012).
2013: Vadim Kuramshin,   Kazakhstan
2014: Mahienour El-Massry,   Egypt
2015: Waleed Abulkhair,   Saudi Arabia
2016: Wang Yu (lawyer),   China
2017: Mohammed Al-Rukn,   United Arab Emirates
2018: Nasrin Sotoudeh, Iran
2019: Rommel Duran, Colombia
2020: Ebru and Barkin Timtik, Turkey
2021: Freshta Karimi, Afghanistan
2022: Amirsalar Davoudi, Iran

Special Mention of the Jury

Since 2016, the Jury awards annually the "Special Mention of the Jury"  to a bar that has illustrated by its action, its work or its sufferings the defense of human rights The following is the list of distinguished bars: 
2017: Balochistan Bar Council
2018: Diyarbakir Bar Association (Dyabakir Barosu)
2019:
2020: 
2021: The Bar Association of Beirut, Lebanon
2022: The Warsaw Bar Association, Poland

External links
 Official website
 Jailed activist Mahienour El-Massry wins international rights award

References

Awards established in 1984
Human rights awards